Marie Halvey (1895–1967) was an American film editor active during the late 1920s and early 1930s.

She was born in Chicago, Illinois, to John Halvey and Sarah Casey. By the early 1920s, she and her sister Geraldine (future Hal Roach bathing girl and wife of stuntman Leo Nomis) had moved to Los Angeles.

Halvey started off in the film industry as a stenographer, working for Archie Mayo at Samuel Goldwyn Studio. She eventually worked her way into a continuity role and finally an editing role, working on a string of Herbert Brenon films. Later on in her career, she worked as a script girl for directors like Ernst Lubitsch and H.C. Potter.

Selected filmography 

 Bachelor Apartment (1931)
 Beau Ideal (1931)
 Lawful Larceny (1930)
 The Case of Sergeant Grischa (1930)
 Lummox (1930)
 The Rescue (1929)
 Laugh, Clown, Laugh (1928)
 Sorrell and Son (1927)

References 

American film editors
American women film editors
1895 births
1967 deaths